The 1884 East Coast by-election was a by-election held on 16 June 1884 in the  electorate during the 8th New Zealand Parliament.

The by-election was caused by the resignation of the incumbent MP Allan McDonald.

He was replaced by Samuel Locke. A show of hands had preferred Rees, who said he was opposed by the government.

Rees subsequently accused Locke of "corrupt practices" during the by-election.

Results
The following table gives the election result:

References

East Coast 1884
1884 elections in New Zealand
Politics of the Bay of Plenty Region
June 1884 events